Union City is a village in Branch and Calhoun counties in the U.S. state of Michigan. Located mostly within Union Township in Branch County, it sits at the junction of the Coldwater and St. Joseph rivers; the Calhoun County portion lies within that county's Burlington Township. It is part of the Battle Creek, Michigan Metropolitan Statistical Area. The population was 1,599 at the 2010 census.

M-60 passes just north of the village.

History
This is a small picturesque and historic town that functions primarily as an adjunct community to the greater Coldwater and Battle Creek areas. It has a striking turn-of-the-century look architecturally, with well–preserved downtown buildings and several Victorian style homes. A Civil War monument can be seen on the north end of the main street area in the churchyard, while a veteran's memorial along the riverbank to the south end commemorates those who fought in more recent wars.

Union City was first settled by Justin Goodwin in 1833, when he built a mill here and became the first postmaster, calling it "Goodwinville". A year later, he sold several hundred acres to E. W. Morgan, who officially platted the site, renaming it from the "union" of the Coldwater and St. Joseph Rivers, which join there. A consortium of four proprietors bought the site in 1837. It was eventually incorporated as a village in 1866.

Union City was designated as Station No. 2 of the famous Underground Railroad, where John D. Zimmerman (1811-1879), formerly of Connecticut, was stationmaster. The slaves seeking refuge were taken into a home built around 1840 by Mr. Zimmerman, who arrived in Union City from Fairfield, Connecticut, in the spring of 1838. He brought with him a set of blacksmith tools to operate the blacksmith shop promised for him by Israel Ward Clark, one of the four proprietors of the village of Union City in 1837. In September 1839, Zimmerman returned to Union City with his family; he soon built a wagon factory, blacksmith shop, and a Greek Revival house. Outraged by the institution of slavery, Zimmerman became a stationmaster for the Underground Railroad, hiding escaped slaves in his house and assisting them in their flight to Canada and freedom. The home is on the list of Michigan State Historic Sites and is located at 119 East High Street.

In the early 1920s Union City built a hydroelectrical plant to deliver cheaper electricity to the town. By 1923 Riley Dam was constructed on nearby St. Joseph River, and the backwater forms Union Lake.  Union Lake is known for its many stumps that occasionally create problems for power boaters.

Children's author and illustrator Patricia Polacco lives in Union City. Her home, the Meteor Ridge Farm, formerly called The Plantation, was built in 1859 or 1860 and also served as a stop on the Underground Railroad, even receiving a personal visit from President Lincoln. One of Polacco's first books, Meteor!, is based on a true story of a meteor that fell on a farm in the town. Union City now has an annual Meteor Festival in early July, with many activities for children. The original meteor of the story resides in Riverside Cemetery as a family marker.

Union City also sponsors an annual Memorial Day parade, and holds a community Memorial Day service at Riverside Cemetery.

Parts of the horror film trilogy Evil Dead were filmed west of Union City.

Notable people
Orson Bennett, Medal of Honor recipient.
Patricia Polacco, children's writer
Josh McDowell, Christian evangelist and writer
Floyd Odlum, businessman, and husband of Jacqueline Cochran, aviator
Orville Hubbard, longtime Mayor of Dearborn, Michigan
Lee Bartlett, former Olympic javelin record holder

Geography
The ZIP code is 49094 and the FIPS place code is 81360.

Demographics

2010 census
As of the census of 2010, there were 1,599 people, 631 households, and 427 families living in the village. The racial makeup of the village was 95.2% White, 0.4% African American, 0.6% Native American, 0.8% Asian, 0.2% from other races, and 2.8% from two or more races. Hispanic or Latino of any race were 1.0% of the population.

There were 631 households, of which 36.8% had children under the age of 18 living with them, 45.8% were married couples living together, 16.5% had a female householder with no husband present, 5.4% had a male householder with no wife present, and 32.3% were non-families. 27.9% of all households were made up of individuals, and 12.8% had someone living alone who was 65 years of age or older. The average household size was 2.53 and the average family size was 3.04.

The median age in the village was 35.7 years. 27.6% of residents were under the age of 18; 8.2% were between the ages of 18 and 24; 26.5% were from 25 to 44; 24.1% were from 45 to 64; and 13.8% were 65 years of age or older. The gender makeup of the village was 48.5% male and 51.5% female.

2000 census
As of the census of 2000, there were 1,804 people, 685 households, and 474 families living in the village. The racial makeup of the village was 95.90% White, 0.61% African American, 0.39% Native American, 0.44% Asian, 0.55% from other races, and 2.11% from two or more races. Hispanic or Latino of any race were 1.05% of the population.

There were 685 households, out of which 36.6% had children under the age of 18 living with them, 51.5% were married couples living together, 13.0% had a female householder with no husband present, and 30.7% were non-families. 25.7% of all households were made up of individuals, and 11.2% had someone living alone who was 65 years of age or older. The average household size was 2.62 and the average family size was 3.15.

In the village, the population was spread out, with 29.9% under the age of 18, 8.8% from 18 to 24, 28.3% from 25 to 44, 21.3% from 45 to 64, and 11.6% who were 65 years of age or older. The median age was 33 years. For every 100 females, there were 93.8 males. For every 100 females age 18 and over, there were 93.3 males.

The median income for a household in the village was $37,065, and the median income for a family was $43,984. Males had a median income of $32,143 versus $21,571 for females. The per capita income for the village was $15,101. About 7.9% of families and 11.7% of the population were below the poverty line, including 18.9% of those under age 18 and 4.7% of those age 65 or over.

Transportation

References

External links
Union City

Villages in Branch County, Michigan
Villages in Calhoun County, Michigan
Villages in Michigan
Populated places on the Underground Railroad